The 1892 United States presidential election in Ohio was held on November 8, 1892. State voters chose 23 electors to the Electoral College, who voted for president and vice president.

Ohio was narrowly won by the Republican Party candidate, incumbent President Benjamin Harrison, with 47.66% of the popular vote. The Democratic Party candidate, former President Grover Cleveland, garnered 47.53% of the popular vote.

This was the last time until 2020 that an incumbent president won the state while losing re-election nationally, and the last election until 1944 that the state would vote for a losing candidate.

Results

Results by county

See also
 United States presidential elections in Ohio

References

Ohio
1892
1892 Ohio elections